Brandon Tabb (born December 25, 1995) is an American basketball player for the Norrköping Dolphins of the Basketligan. He played college basketball for Bethune-Cookman.

College career

Tabb attended Kecoughtan High School in Hampton, Virginia and averaged 19.8 points per game as a senior. Due to subpar academics, he did not qualify for Division I and attended the College of Central Florida for two years, where he averaged 15.3 points per game as a sophomore. He transferred to Bethune Cookman and averaged 18 points per game as a junior. Tabb set the single-season three pointer record as a junior at Bethune-Cookman with 106 treys. As a senior, Tabb averaged 19 points per game. He scored 34 points against Coppin State and Morgan State. At the conclusion of the regular season Tabb was named MEAC Player of the Year.

Professional career
On August 23, 2018, he has signed with Horsens IC of the Basketligaen.

On July 3, 2019, he has signed with GTK Gliwice of the PLK. Tabb averaged 14.5 points, 3.3 rebounds, 2.5 assists and 1.8 steals per game. On September 11, 2020, Tabb signed with the Svendborg Rabbits of the Basketligaen. He averaged 17.7 points, 4.3 rebounds, 2.5 assists, and 1.9 steals per game. On August 1, 2021, Tabb signed in Sweden with the Norrköping Dolphins.

References

External links
Bethune-Cookman Wildcats bio

1995 births
Living people
African-American basketball players
American expatriate basketball people in Denmark
American expatriate basketball people in Poland
American expatriate basketball people in Sweden
American men's basketball players
Basketball players from Virginia
Bethune–Cookman Wildcats men's basketball players
Horsens IC players
Junior college men's basketball players in the United States
Norrköping Dolphins players
Shooting guards
Small forwards
Sportspeople from Hampton, Virginia
21st-century African-American sportspeople